The Secretary of State of Iowa is the commissioner of elections of the U.S. state of Iowa. A constitutional officer, the officeholder is elected every four years. The Office of the Secretary of State is divided into four divisions: Elections and Voter Registration, Business Services, Administrative Services, and Communications and Publications.

Elections and Voter Registration deals with supervising the 99 county auditors, elections, and voter registration. The division of the office helps the county auditors in telling them which election practices work best. The division also helps in increasing voter registration. The Business Services Division is a records center for businesses in Iowa. The Administrative Services Division and the Communications and Publications Division is involved in scheduling and providing media information, preservation of documents, recordkeeping, and publishing the Iowa Official Register and the Iowa Official Directory of Federal, State and County Officers. The Secretary of State's office is housed in the Lucas State Office Building in Des Moines.

List of secretaries of state of Iowa

References

 Office of the Secretary of State
 Iowa Official Register 2005-2006
 History of the Office